Minna Gale (September 26, 1865 – March 4, 1944), also credited as Minna K. Gale and Minna Gale Haynes, was an American actress.

Early life
Minna Kathalina Gale was born in Elizabeth, New Jersey, the daughter of James and Cornelia K. Gale; after her father's death, she lived in Europe and studied music and theatre in Paris and Frankfurt. "She speaks two languages besides English sufficiently well to play in either of them," noted one reviewer in 1886.

Career
Minna Gale was known for Shakespearean roles in her early career. In 1885, at age nineteen, Gale was cast as Queen Gertrude, in Lawrence Barrett's production of Hamlet (Barrett, playing her son in the title role, was 47 years old). She stayed with Barrett's company for six seasons, sometimes as a rival to Helena Modjeska. Later, she played Ophelia to Edwin Booth's last performance as Hamlet. Her beauty was often mentioned in reviews. "If there is a young lady in this land who wishes to look bewitching when mad, she must assiduously cultivate the Minna Gale pout," remarked one theatre writer in 1892. She formed her own company after Barrett's death, and briefly retired from the stage in 1893, after her marriage. 

In 1903 Gale-Haynes returned to acting as Rosalind in a production of As You Like It, given as a benefit for Vassar College on Shakespeare's birthday. Broadway appearances by Gale included roles in The Triumph of Love (1904), The White Sister (1909, written by Francis Marion Crawford and starring Viola Allen), A Celebrated Case (1915), The Pride of Race (1916), A Tailor-Made Man (1917), The Outrageous Mrs. Palmer (1920), Tarzan of the Apes (1921), and The Rubicon (1922).

Gale appeared in several silent films, including The Prisoner of Zenda (1913), Clothes (1914), The Port of Missing Men (1914), The Unwelcome Mrs. Hatch (1914), The Dancing Girl (1915), and A Fool There Was (1915, with Theda Bara).

Personal life
Minna K. Gale married insurance executive Archibald Cushman Haynes in 1892, as his second wife; she was widowed when he died in 1912. She died at home in Riverside, Connecticut in 1944, aged 74 years, survived by an adopted daughter, Dorothy Haynes Vollmer.

References

External links

 An undated photograph of Minna Gale,  from scrapbook "Edwin Booth and Lawrence Barrett, 1887-1888 Season", in the Owen Fawcett Theatre Collection, University of Tennessee Knoxville.
 An 1892 photograph of Minna Gale in costume, in the Macauley's Theatre Collection, University of Louisville Photographic Archives. 

1869 births
1944 deaths
American stage actresses
People from Elizabeth, New Jersey
Actresses from New Jersey
American silent film actresses
19th-century American actresses
20th-century American actresses